Chandrasiri Ariyawansa Suriyaarachchi is a Sri Lankan politician, a member of the Parliament of Sri Lanka and a government minister.

References
 

Living people
Members of the 9th Parliament of Sri Lanka
Members of the 13th Parliament of Sri Lanka
Members of the 14th Parliament of Sri Lanka
Government ministers of Sri Lanka
United National Party politicians
United People's Freedom Alliance politicians
1953 births